Juriniopsis adusta is a species of bristle fly in the family Tachinidae. It is found in North America.

References

Further reading

External links

Tachininae
Articles created by Qbugbot
Insects described in 1888